The Northwest Upsalquitch River is a tributary of the South bank of the Upsalquitch River, crossing the parishes of Saint-Quentin, Eldon and Addington, in Restigouche County, in the northwest of New Brunswick, in Canada.

In his course Eastward, the “Northwest Upsalquitch River” flows in a small valley nestled between the mountains and its course passes at the Northwest of the Caribou Mountain the end.

Geography 

“Northwest Upsalquitch River” originates from a mountain stream in the Restigouche County.

The source of the river is located in forest area:
•  at the Southeast from the village of Saint-Martin-de-Restigouche;
•  at Northeast from the village of Saint-Quentin;
•  at Southwest of the confluence of the “Northwest Upsalquitch River”;
•  at Southwest of the confluence of the Upsalquitch River;

From its source, the “Northwest Upsalquitch River” flows in a small valley surrounded by high mountains, on  according to the following segments:

Upper Courses of the river (segment of )

  to the Southeast in the Saint-Quentin up to a stream (from the Southwest);
  Eastward up to the edge of the Edon Parish;
  to the Northwest in Edon Parish, up to a stream (from the West);
  to the Northeast, up to Chisholm Brook (from the West);
  to the Southeast, up to Black Brook (from the Southwest);
  to the Northeast, winding up to Wild Creek (from the West);
  to the Northeast, up to Twenty Eight Mile Brook (from the Southwest);
  to the Northeast, up to Richie Brook (from the West);

Lower course of the river (segment of )

  eastward up to Oxford Brook (from the South);
  to the Northeast, up to Burntland Brook (from the West);
  to the Northeast, up to Eighteen Mile Brook (from the north);
  eastward up to the edge of the Addington Parish;
  to the southeast in the Addington Parish, up to Nine Mile Brook (from the South);
  to the Northeast, up to Cravens Gulch (from the West);
  to the Northeast, passing at northwest of Caribou mountain, up to the confluence of the “Northwest Upsalquitch River”.

Northwest Upsalquitch River empties into a river bend on the West bank of the Upsalquitch River. The confluence of “Northwest Upsalquitch River” is located at  Northwest from the confluence of the Upsalquitch River.

See also 

 
 Restigouche County
 Saint-Quentin Parish, New Brunswick
 Eldon Parish, New Brunswick
 Addington Parish, New Brunswick
 List of rivers of New Brunswick
 Chaleur Bay
 Gulf of Saint Lawrence
 Restigouche River
 Upsalquitch River

References

External links 
 Website of “Conseil de Gestion du Bassin Versant de la Rivière Restigouche inc” - Restigouche River Watershed Management Council inc
 Northwest / Trekking - Quebec - Report of a boating expedition on Upsalquitch River

Rivers of New Brunswick
Canadian Heritage Rivers